Sammy Moore (15 September 1900 – 1 March 1989) was an Irish water polo player. He competed in the men's tournament at the 1928 Summer Olympics.

References

External links
 

1900 births
1989 deaths
Irish male water polo players
Olympic water polo players of Ireland
Water polo players at the 1928 Summer Olympics
Place of birth missing